Kamalpur is a village in Surendranagar district in the Indian state of Gujarat.

References

Villages in Surendranagar district